Edward or Ed Valentine may refer to:
Edward Virginius Valentine (1838–1930), American sculptor
Edward K. Valentine (1843–1916), U.S. Representative from Nebraska
 Edward R. Valentine, at one time CEO of J. W. Robinson's department store
Ed Valentine, American soccer player

See also
Edward Valentine Blomfield (1788–1816), classical scholar